The Lottery Ticket Seller (Spanish: El billetero) is a 1953 Mexican drama film directed by Raphael J. Sevilla and starring David Silva, Esther Fernández and  Rodolfo Acosta.

Cast

References

Bibliography 
 Rogelio Agrasánchez. Cine Mexicano: Posters from the Golden Age, 1936-1956. Chronicle Books, 2001.

External links 
 

1953 films
1953 drama films
Mexican drama films
1950s Spanish-language films
Films directed by Raphael J. Sevilla
Mexican black-and-white films
1950s Mexican films